is the 41st single by the Japanese idol girl group AKB48. It was released in Japan on August 26, 2015. It was number one on the weekly Oricon Singles Chart, with 1,277,761 copies also becoming the best-selling single in Japan in August. It was also number one on the Billboard Japan Hot 100. A JKT48 version of this song was released on the same day, while a SNH48 version was released in October 12.

Background 
The member lineup for the title track and several supporting B-sides was determined by the results from the annual election held by AKB48 and its several sister groups (in 2015 it was called "AKB48 41st Single Senbatsu General Election"). Rino Sashihara, having won the election, serves as the center (choreography center) in the title song.

Musical style 
The title track is done in a dark disco style, as opposed to the brightness of "Koi Suru Fortune Cookie" (the girl group's election single from two years ago). JKT48, the Jakarta-based sister group to AKB, released a dangdut version of the song.

The full version music video (included only in limited editions) was released on YouTube in December 9, along with the 42nd single "Kuchibiru ni Be My Baby".

Release 
The single was released in several versions: Type A (two editions: limited and regular), Type B (limited and regular), Type C (limited and regular), Type D (limited and regular), and a version called the "Theater Edition". All versions, except the Theater Edition, include a DVD with several music videos.

The title song was for the first time performed in public on July 4, 2015, on the NTV TV show  (an 11-hour long music special).

On AKB48 Fes 2016 this song is played as main set closer, with live band accompaniment.

The song "Ippome Ondo" in Type C is a traditional music of Bon festival.

Music video 
The music video for the title track was directed by Kazuaki Seki, who had previously directed music videos for a number of other Japanese artists.

Track listings 
All lyrics were written by Yasushi Akimoto.

Type A

Type B

Type C

Type D

Theater Edition

Personnel

"Halloween Night" 
The senbatsu (member selection/lineup) for the song consists of 16 members. The center is Rino Sashihara.
 AKB48 Team A: Haruka Shimazaki, Minami Takahashi, Yui Yokoyama
 AKB48 Team K: Tomu Muto, Jurina Matsui, Sayaka Yamamoto, Sae Miyazawa, Rie Kitahara
 AKB48 Team B: Yuki Kashiwagi, Mayu Watanabe, Miyuki Watanabe
 SKE48 Team KII: Akane Takayanagi, Kaori Matsumura
 SKE48 Team E: Aya Shibata
 HKT48 Team H: Rino Sashihara
 HKT48 Team KIV: Sakura Miyawaki

"Sayonara Surfboard" 
The undergirls selection consists of 16 members. The center is Haruka Kodama.
 AKB48 Team K: Aki Takajo, Minami Minegishi
 AKB48 Team B: Rena Kato, Yuria Kizaki
 AKB48 Team 4: Nana Okada, Mako Kojima, Juri Takahashi
 SKE48 Team S: Masana Oya
 SKE48 Team KII: Mina Oba, Nao Furuhata
 SKE48 Team E: Akari Suda, Marika Tani
 HKT48 Team H: Haruka Kodama, Meru Tashima
 HKT48 Team KIV: Mio Tomonaga, Mai Fuchigami

"Mizu no Naka no Dendōritsu"
The Next Girls selection consists of 16 members. The center is Chihiro Anai.
 AKB48 Team K: Yūka Tano, Mion Mukaichi
 AKB48 Team B: Natsuki Uchiyama
 SKE48 Team S: Haruka Futamura, Ami Miyamae
 SKE48 Team E: Kanon Kimoto
 NMB48 Team N: Kei Jonishi
 NMB48 Team M: Miru Shiroma, Reina Fujie, Fuuko Yagura
 HKT48 Team H: Chihiro Anai, Yui Kojina, Rino Sakaguchi
 HKT48 Team KIV: Aika Ota, Kanna Okada, Madoka Moriyasu

"Kimi ni Wedding Dress o..."
The Future Girls selection consists of 16 members. The center is Sumire Satō.
 AKB48 Team A: Yukari Sasaki
 AKB48 Team K: Shinobu Mogi
 SKE48 Team S: Rion Azuma, Risako Goto, Suzuran Yamauchi
 SKE48 Team KII: Sarina Souda
 SKE48 Team E: Kyoka Isohara, Rumi Kato, Sumire Satō
 NMB48 Team N: Ayaka Umeda, Nagisa Shibuya, Shu Yabushita
 HKT48 Team H: Natsumi Matsuoka

"Kimi Dake ga Akimeiteita"
The Upcoming Girls selection consists of 16 members. The center is Makiko Saito.
 AKB48 Team A: Nana Owada
 AKB48 Team K: Haruka Ishida, Ayana Shinozaki, Mariya Nagao
 AKB48 Team 4: Miyuu Omori
 SKE48 Team S: Ryoha Kitagawa, Mai Takeuchi
 SKE48 Team KII: Anna Ishida
 SKE48 Team E: Madoka Umemoto, Natsuki Kamata, Haruka Kumazaki, Makiko Saito
 NMB48 Team M: Airi Tanigawa
 NMB48 Team BII: Miori Ichikawa
 HKT48 Team KIV: Nao Ueki, Aoi Motomura

"Ippome Ondo"
Consists of 16 members. The center is Mayu Watanabe.
 AKB48 Team A: Nana Owada, Haruna Kojima, Haruka Shimazaki, Minami Takahashi, Yui Yokoyama
 AKB48 Team K: Mion Mukaichi
 AKB48 Team B: Ryoka Oshima, Natsuki Uchiyama, Rena Kato, Yuria Kizaki
 AKB48 Team 4: Mako Kojima, Juri Takahashi
 SKE48 Team S: Jurina Matsui
 NMB48 Team N: Sayaka Yamamoto
 NMB48 Team BII: Miyuki Watanabe
 HKT48 Team H: Haruka Kodama
 HKT48 Team KIV: Sakura Miyawaki

"Yankee Machine Gun"
The opening theme of Majisuka Gakuen 5, consists of 18 members. The centers are Haruka Shimazaki and Sakura Miyawaki.
 AKB48 Team A: Nana Owada, Anna Iriyama, Haruka Shimazaki, Minami Takahashi, Yui Yokoyama
 AKB48 Team K: Mion Mukaichi
 AKB48 Team B: Ryoka Oshima, Natsuki Uchiyama, Rena Kato, Yuria Kizaki
 AKB48 Team 4: Mako Kojima, Juri Takahashi
 SKE48 Team S: Jurina Matsui
 NMB48 Team N: Sayaka Yamamoto
 NMB48 Team BII: Miyuki Watanabe
 HKT48 Team H: Haruka Kodama
 HKT48 Team KIV: Sakura Miyawaki
 AKB48 Graduates: Rina Kawaei

"Gunzō"
The ending theme of Majisuka Gakuen 5, consists of 7 members.
 AKB48 Team A: Haruka Shimazaki, Minami Takahashi, Yui Yokoyama
 SKE48 Team S: Jurina Matsui
 NMB48 Team N: Sayaka Yamamoto
 HKT48 Team H: Haruka Kodama
 HKT48 Team KIV: Sakura Miyawaki

Release history

References 

AKB48 songs
2015 singles
Halloween songs
Songs with lyrics by Yasushi Akimoto
King Records (Japan) singles
Oricon Weekly number-one singles
Billboard Japan Hot 100 number-one singles
2015 songs